The 1992–93 Belarusian Premier League was the second season of top-tier football in Belarus. It started on 1 August 1992 and ended on 17 June 1993. Dinamo Minsk were the defending champions.

Team changes from 1992 season
No team has relegated after 1992 season. The winners of 1992 Belarusian First League (Dinamo-2 Minsk) were promoted and the league was expanded to 17 teams for one season only.

In order to play in Premier League, Dinamo-2 Minsk split from their parent team Dinamo Minsk into separate football club (although both teams remained the parts of the same organization) and changed their name to Belarus Minsk.

SKB-Lokomotiv Vitebsk changed their name to Lokomotiv Vitebsk prior to the season. Another four clubs changed their names during the winter break (Traktor Bobruisk to Fandok Bobruisk, Khimik Grodno to Neman Grodno, BelAZ Zhodino to Torpedo Zhodino and Metallurg Molodechno to FC Molodechno).

Overview
Dinamo Minsk won their 2nd champions title and qualified for the next season's Champions League. 1992–93 cup winners Neman Grodno qualified for the Cup Winners' Cup. Obuvshchik Lida and Torpedo Zhodino relegated to the First League.

Teams and venues

Due to bad pitch conditions, scheduling conflicts and other reasons several games were played at other venues.

Table

Results

Top scorers

See also
1992–93 Belarusian First League
1992–93 Belarusian Cup

External links
RSSSF

Belarusian Premier League seasons
1992 in Belarusian football
1993 in Belarusian football
Belarus